The 2015 Major League Soccer All-Star Game, the 20th annual Major League Soccer All-Star Game, took place on July 29, 2015 (9 p.m. EDT, 7 p.m. local time) at Dick's Sporting Goods Park in the Denver suburb of Commerce City, Colorado, the home of the Colorado Rapids. The game was televised live on Fox Sports 1 and UniMás in the United States, and TSN and RDS in Canada.

Kaká was named MVP. Also, 2015 MLS Homegrown Game was played one day before this event.

Squads

MLS All-Stars
As of July 29, 2015

Notes:
2015 MLS All-Star Fan XI.
Selected by All-Star coach Pablo Mastroeni of the Colorado Rapids.
Selected by MLS Commissioner Don Garber
Injured or otherwise unable to play.
Replacement for player who is injured or otherwise unable to play.

Selection controversy
The league commissioner Don Garber used his two picks to select two players who had never played a single minute in MLS at the time of selection in the two former England internationals Steven Gerrard and Frank Lampard who had only officially joined the league on July 8. This provoked outrage from fans, the media and other players, the league eventually agreed to select two extra players to be given all-star bonuses.

The league's top scorer, Kei Kamara, was omitted from the Fan XI and responded by saying "It's simple as it goes: you're either a U.S. national team player or you're a DP to be on there. I'm neither one of those. If I get called up, I'll be lucky." The top 10 in the fan vote included 8 players who have represented the US national team alongside Kaká and David Villa with Nigerian international Obafemi Martins also being selected via virtual performances in FIFA 15.

Tottenham Hotspur
On July 27 Tottenham Hotspur announced a 25-man traveling squad for the MLS All-Star game:

 

Notes:
Injured or unable to play.
Development Squad
Second Year Academy

Match

Details

References

2015
Mls All-Star Game 2015
All-Star Game
MLS All-Star Game
Sports competitions in Colorado
July 2015 sports events in the United States
Commerce City, Colorado